is the 11th-generation head of the Tokugawa clan.  He is also the present head of the Tayasu branch of the Gosankyō.

Early life
Munefusa was born in London.  He is a graduate of Gakushūin and Keio University (Keiō Gijuku Daigaku).

He was a member of the 77th class—the last class—of the Imperial Japanese Naval Academy (Kaigun Heigakkō).

Selected works
In a statistical overview derived from writings by and about Munefusa Tokugawa, OCLC/WorldCat encompasses roughly 8 works in 10 publications in 1 language and 20+ library holdings.

 徳川家に伝わる徳川四百年の内緖話  (2004)
 徳川家に伝わる徳川四百年の内緖話. ライバル敵将篇 (2005)
 最後の幕閣 : 徳川家に伝わる47人の真実 (2006)
 江田島海軍兵学校究極の人間教育 (2006)
 徳川将軍家秘伝大老vs上さまvs大奥の舞台裏 (2008)
 徳川家が見た幕末維新 (2010)

Notes

References
 Nussbaum, Louis-Frédéric and Käthe Roth. (2005).  Japan encyclopedia. Cambridge: Harvard University Press. ;  OCLC 58053128

1929 births
Living people
Tokugawa clan
Keio University alumni